The 2021 Fanatec GT2 European Series is the first season of the GT2 European Series. The season begins on 17 April at Autodromo Nazionale Monza in Monza and will end on 2 October at Circuit Paul Ricard in Le Castellet.

Calendar 
A round scheduled for Silverstone on 25–27 June was cancelled and replaced with Misano on the following weekend.

Entry List

Race Results

Bold indicates overall winner.

Championship standings
Scoring system
Championship points are awarded for the first ten positions in each race. Entries are required to complete 75% of the winning car's race distance in order to be classified and earn points.

Drivers' championships
{|
|

See also 

 2021 GT World Challenge Europe
 2021 GT World Challenge Europe Endurance Cup
 2021 GT World Challenge Asia
 2021 GT World Challenge America
 2021 GT World Challenge Australia

Notes

References

External links 

 

Grand tourers
GT2 European Series